B41 or B-41 may refer to:

 D41 road (Croatia), a Croatian expressway connecting Vrbovec to the Hungarian border
 Bundesstraße 41, a federal highway in Germany
 B41 (New York City bus), a bus route in Brooklyn, New York City, United States
 B41 nuclear bomb, a thermonuclear weapon deployed by the United States in the early 1960s
 HLA-B41, an HLA-B serotype
 B-41 Liberator, an American aircraft during World War II
 B41, Vietnamese designation of RPG-7 rocket-propelled grenade